The Chair of Ecclesiastical History of the University of Glasgow is the oldest chair of ecclesiastical history in the United Kingdom. 

It was founded in 1716 by King George I of Great Britain. The Crown granted 100 pounds per year for this purpose. This was, thus, a Regius Chair until 1935, when constitutional arrangements in the Church of Scotland resulted in patronage being transferred to the University Court acting on a Board of Nomination consisting of representatives of the University Court and the General Assembly of the Church of Scotland.

List of professors
 William Anderson MA (1721)
 William Rouet MA (1752)
 William Wight MA DD (1778)
 Hugh Macleod MA DD (1809) 
 James Seaton Reid MA DD (1841)
 Thomas Thomson Jackson MA DD (1851)
 William Lee MA DD (1874)
 Robert Herbert Story MA DD LLD (1886)
 James Cooper MA DD LittD DCL [1898]
 Archibald Main MA DD DLitt LLD (1922-1942)
 William Dickie Niven MA LLD DD (1946)
 John Foster MA DD (1949)
 William Hugh Clifford Frend TD MA DPhil DD FRSE FBA (1969-1984)
 W. Ian P. Hazlett BA BD DTheo DLitt DD (2002-2010)
 Charlotte Methuen MA BD PhD (2017-)

See also
 List of Professorships at the University of Glasgow

References
 Michael Moss, Moira Rankin and Lesley Richmond, Who, Where and When: the History and Constitution of the University of Glasgow (Glasgow: University of Glasgow, 2001).
 Paul L. Robertson, "The Finances of Glasgow University Before 1914", History of Education Quarterly Winter (1976):449-478

Ecclesiastical History
Ecclesiastical History, *, Glasgow
1716 establishments in Scotland